

The Fletcher FL-23 was an American two-seat liaison or observation aircraft designed and built by the California-based Fletcher Aviation Corporation. It was entered into a competition and lost against the Cessna 305A as a liaison or observation aircraft for the United States Army.

Development
The FL-23 prototype was designed and built as a private venture, it was a high-wing cantilever monoplane with an all-moving tailplane mounted at the top of the fin. It had a fixed tricycle landing gear and powered a 225-hp (168 kW) Continental E225 piston engine. It had room for a pilot and observer in tandem; the observer had an unusual acrylic plastic enclosure to give an all-round visibility.

Operational history
The US Army issued the specification for a two-seat liaison and observation monoplane and the prototype was entered into the competition. During trials the aircraft was badly damaged in a flying accident when it lost its tail, and was withdrawn from the competition. The competition was won by the Cessna 305A which became the L-19 Bird Dog.

Specifications

See also

References

FL-23
1950s United States military reconnaissance aircraft
High-wing aircraft
Single-engined tractor aircraft
Aircraft first flown in 1950
T-tail aircraft